Carl Cederschiöld is a Swedish former Moderate Party politician.

He was an active member of the Confederation of Swedish Conservative and Liberal Students and was chairman between 1972 and 1973. He was elected to Stockholm City Council in 1976. With the Moderate election victory in 1991, Cederschiöld became Mayor and Commissioner of Finance. The Moderate Party, however, lost the election in 1994 and Cederschiöld returned to leading the opposition.

The 1998 election saw the return of the Moderate Party to power in Stockholm and Cederschiöld to the post of Mayor. The new Moderate Party administration launched a wide-reaching reform programme with cuts in both taxes and welfare benefits. The 2002 election, however, was catastrophic for the Moderate Party on the national level and that also swept the Social Democrats into power in Stockholm. After the election he retired from politics. He was replaced as leader of the Moderates in Stockholm by Kristina Axén Olin.

Carl Cederschiöld is married to Charlotte Cederschiöld, a Moderate Party Member of the European Parliament. The Cederschiöld family belongs to the Swedish nobility.

References 

1945 births
Mayors of Stockholm
Moderate Party politicians
Municipal commissioners of Sweden
Living people
Swedish nobility
Carl